Sally Slade Warner (September 6, 1932 – December 4, 2009) was a leading American carillonneur, carillon composer and arranger, and a church organist. She played the carillon at St. Stephen's Episcopal Church in Cohasset, Massachusetts, and the former carillon at Phillips Academy in Andover, Massachusetts.

Life and career 
Warner majored in organ performance at the New England Conservatory of Music. She commenced carillon studies with Earl A. Chamberlain at St. Stephen's Episcopal Church in Cohasset, Massachusetts, then earned a diploma in 1979 from the Royal Carillon School "Jef Denyn" in Belgium studying with Piet van den Broek. She also pursued lessons with Milford Myhre at Bok Tower Gardens and passed the examination of The Guild of Carillonneurs in North America (GCNA) in 1980.

In 1985, Warner succeeded Earl Chamberlain as carillonneur of St. Stephen's Episcopal Church, and also served for years as carillonneur, associate faculty member, and music librarian at Phillips Academy.

In 1988, Warner was awarded the Berkeley Medal from the University of California, Berkeley, for distinguished service to the carillon. She was also recognized by the GCNA as an honorary member. Her papers are preserved in the GCNA Heritage Music Collection. In 2019, the GCNA established a Sally Slade Warner Arrangements & Transcriptions Competition in her honor.

Selected musical works
 Hymn Settings for Carillon, Set 3, GCNA (1995)
 Passacaglia on E-A-C, American Carillon Music Editions (1998)
 Variations for carillon on the song Die alder soetste Jesus (The most beloved Jesus), GCNA (2005)

References

External links
 

1932 births
2009 deaths
20th-century American women musicians
20th-century American composers
21st-century American composers
21st-century American women musicians
American organists
Carillonneurs
Composers for carillon
American women classical composers
American classical composers
Classical musicians from Massachusetts
Royal Carillon School "Jef Denyn" alumni
Music librarians
20th-century classical composers
21st-century classical composers
New England Conservatory alumni